Qaleh-ye Khalili (also Romanized as Qal‘eh-ye Khalīlī; also known as Khalīlī) is a village in Hamaijan Rural District, Hamaijan District, Sepidan County, Fars Province, Iran. At the 2006 census, its population was 561, in 122 families.

References 

Populated places in Sepidan County